Open Hollow is a valley in Shannon County in the U.S. state of Missouri.

Open Hollow was named for the fact it is relatively wide.

References

Valleys of Shannon County, Missouri
Valleys of Missouri